Korkinsky District is an administrative and municipal district (raion), one of the twenty-seven in Chelyabinsk Oblast, Russia. It is located in the center of the oblast. Its administrative center is the town of Korkino. Population (excluding the administrative center):

References

Notes

Sources

Districts of Chelyabinsk Oblast